The 2016 NRL Auckland Nines (known as the Downer NRL Auckland Nines due to sponsorship) was the third NRL Auckland Nines competition. It was held on 6–7 February 2016 at Eden Park in Auckland, New Zealand. As with previous tournaments, it was contested by all sixteen National Rugby League teams. The draw was released on 18 November 2015. The same pool names were used as the 2015 tournament's. The pool names were: Hunua, Waiheke, Rangitoto and Piha. The event included two international women's teams, the Kiwiferns and the Jillaroos, who competed in a three-game series. Originally to be sponsored by Dick Smith, the tournament was instead sponsored by Downer Group after Dick Smith went into receivership. The Parramatta Eels who won the tournament were later stripped of the title due to salary cap breaches.

Tournament Games

Hunua pool

Rangitoto pool

Waiheke pool

Piha pool

Finals

Quarterfinals

Semi-finals

Final

Ferns v Jillaroos

Team of the tournament
Corey Norman was named the player of the tournament. The team of the tournament was;

References

NRL Auckland Nines
Auckland Nines
Parramatta Eels